Michael Toon (born 11 April 1979 in Brisbane) is an Australian rowing coxswain. He is a former Australian national champion, an U23 world champion, an Olympian and a medallist at world championships and the 2004 Olympics.

Early life
Toon was born with a rare condition known as "transposition of the great vessels". At the age of three, he required open-heart surgery to ease the problem and had a cardiac pacemaker fitted when he was just seven. He was unable to play contact sports at school and his heart condition kept him undersized enabling him to taking up coxing.

Club and state rowing
Raised in Queensland, Toon's senior club rowing was from the Toowong Rowing Club.

Toon's first state representation for Queensland came in 1997 when he was selected to cox the Queensland youth eight to contest the Noel F Wilkinson Trophy at the Interstate Regatta within the Australian Rowing Championships. On twelve consecutive occasions from 1998 to 2009 Toon was selected to cox the Queensland men's senior eight contesting the King's Cup at the Interstate Regatta.

In Toowong Rowing Club colours he steered numerous crews in national championship title attempts at the Australian Rowing Championships. He coxed composite Queensland lightweight eights contesting the Australian lightweight eight championship in 2005, 2006, 2007 and 2008. In 2007 he was in the stern of the composite Queensland four which won the Australian coxed four national title.

International representative rowing
Toon made his Australian representative debut aged seventeen steering a coxed four at the 1996 World Rowing U23 Championships in Hazewinkel to fifth place. In 1997 he was in the stern of the Australian U23 men's eight. They raced at World Rowing Cup in Lucerne to tenth place and then competed at the 1997 World Rowing Championships in Milan where they placed fourth. In 1998 he was still in the U23 eight. They contested the World Rowing Cup III in Lucerne before racing at the 1998 World Rowing U23 Championships in Ioannina to a gold medal. In 2000 Toon made his fourth appearance at the U23 World Championships in the stern of the Australian U23 eight who rowed to a silver medal in Copenhagen. Earlier that representative season he steered both the eight and a coxed pair at the World Rowing Cup III in Lucerne.

In 2001 Toon took the ropes of the Australian senior men's eight. They raced at the World Rowing Cup IV in Munich and then at the 2001 World Rowing Championships in Lucerne the eight failed to make the A final and finished in overall seventh place. At the 2002 World Rowing Championships he coxed both an Australian four and a pair and he steered the pair of Tom Laurich and Robert Jahrling to a bronze medal.

Marc Douez coxed the Australian eight to the 2003 World Championships but in time for the 2004 Athens Olympics Toon was back in the stern end of the Australian men's eight. In Athens he steered the eight to a bronze medal.

References

External links
 

1979 births
Living people
Australian male rowers
Sportspeople from Brisbane
Olympic rowers of Australia
Rowers at the 2004 Summer Olympics
Olympic bronze medalists for Australia
Coxswains (rowing)
Olympic medalists in rowing
World Rowing Championships medalists for Australia
Medalists at the 2004 Summer Olympics